Brandee Younger (born July 1, 1983) is an American harpist. Younger infuses classical, jazz, soul, and funk influences to the harp tradition pioneered by her predecessors and idols Dorothy Ashby and Alice Coltrane.  Younger leads her own ensemble, performs as a soloist and has worked as a sideman for such musicians as Pharoah Sanders, Jack DeJohnette, Charlie Haden, Bill Lee and Reggie Workman, and other popular artists including Lauryn Hill, John Legend (Love in the Future), Common (Finding Forever), Ryan Leslie, Drake, Maxwell, The Roots, Moses Sumney and Salaam Remi.  Younger is noted for her work with saxophonist Ravi Coltrane, who was featured on her 2019 release, Soul Awakening. Currently, she records and tours with drummer and producer Makaya McCraven, following the release of his 2018 recording Universal Beings.

Current features 

In April 2019, Younger's original composition "Hortense" was featured in the documentary Homecoming, by Beyoncé. The recording used was from an NPR Music Field recording released in 2013.   Also in the spring of 2019, Younger was selected to present a spotlight performance on the second night of Quincy Jones' "Soundtrack of America", the series opening of The Shed in NYC, curated by Steve McQueen and Quincy Jones himself.  She was also featured in the series-opening concerts, alongside Kelsey Lu and performed a feature with Moses Sumney.  Her original work is also heard in the 2018 HBO TV series Random Acts of Flyness, by filmmaker and director Terence Nance.

Early life 

Brandee grew up in Hempstead, NY and Uniondale, NY and began her harp studies as a teen under the tutelage of Karen Strauss.  She continued her studies with harpists Rebecca Flannery, Susan Jolles, Emily Mitchell, and bassist Nat Reeves.  Younger went on to earn undergraduate degrees in Harp Performance and Music Business from The Hartt School of the University of Hartford.  While there, she was mentored by the faculty of the Jackie McLean Institute of Jazz and African American Studies.  Nate Chinen of The New York Times noted that "Ms. Younger quickly found a kinship with Hartt's jazz program, run at the time by the august alto saxophonist Jackie McLean. He told her to drop by whenever she wanted. 'So I did,' she said." Entering New York University for graduate school six months later, she had already established an impressive résumé, having joined the harp faculty at the Hartt School Community Division, opened for Slide Hampton as a member of Hartford-based collective The New Jazz Workshop and developed a working relationship with Grammy-nominated producer and artist Ryan Leslie and Grammy Award-winning producer Omen.  Building upon that foundation, Younger began working with saxophonist Ravi Coltrane on a series of concerts honoring the music of the late pianist, organist, and harpist, Alice Coltrane.  Younger is the cousin of an urban farmer and MacArthur Fellow Will Allen. She is also the cousin of Jordan Younger, cornerback of the Toronto Argonauts.

Career 

Over time, Younger has built her career as an educator, concert curator, performer, and bandleader of the Brandee Younger Quartet.  Her debut EP, Prelude, was released in June 2011, having been recorded in an analog studio with Dezron Douglas, E.J. Strickland and vocalist Niia.  The original standout track "So Alive" was later featured in the Mercedes Benz Mixed Tape compilation; Mercedes Benz lauded the track as "...a compelling soul-jazz composition, in which all instruments are melded to a haunting universe centered around Niia's celestial voice. Beguiling musical subtlety in these times of loudness."  As a classical musician, Younger has been featured as a soloist with The Harlem Chamber Players and has performed with the Hartford Symphony Orchestra, Waterbury Symphony, Soulful Symphony, Ensemble Du Monde, Camerata New York and the Red Bull Artsehcro, a "non-conformist" orchestra.  Younger was selected to be a 2013 Harlem Arts Festival artist and performed at Marcus Garvey Park at the Richard Rodgers Amphitheater that year. In hip hop and R&B, Younger has worked with Common, Drake and John Legend, to name a few. Younger has released three other recordings as a leader, including the EP Prelude, released in 2011, Live At The Breeding Ground, released in 2014, and Wax & Wane from 2016.

Since the 2011 debut of her Prelude EP, Younger released Brandee Younger Live @ The Breeding Ground, a breakthrough performance on Blue Note Records, Revive Music's 2015 Supreme Sonacy Vol. 1 LP, and the 2016 Wax & Wane LP.  An independent artist, Younger has self-managed throughout her career.  She arranged and performed a track for Impulse Records' 2018 release A Day In The Life: Impressions of Pepper - a tribute to the Beatles' Sgt Pepper's Lonely Hearts Club Band, and she has performed on The Tonight Show with The Roots and producer Salaam Remi.

In August 2020, Younger contributed to the live streamed recording of the singer Bilal's EP VOYAGE-19, created remotely during the COVID-19 lockdowns. It was released the following month with proceeds from its sales going to participating musicians in financial hardship from the pandemic.

Work as an educator 

Younger is on the teaching artist faculty (harp) at New York University and The New School College of Performing Arts.  She has taught at Adelphi University, Nassau Community College, The Hartt School Community Division at the University of Hartford.  She has lectured and conducted master classes at The Royal Conservatory of Music (Toronto), University of Birmingham (UK), Howard University, Drexel University, Princeton University, Trinity College, Berklee College of Music, The Hartt School, Elyria Summer Music Program, Connecticut Valley Harp Intensive, and NOLA Jazz & Pop Festival. She also serves as Symphonic and Jazz Harp Artist in Residence at the Cicely L. Tyson Community School of Performing and Fine Arts.  Recent residencies include intensives at Michigan State University, DePaul University, Tulane University.

Awards and titles 
Younger was nominated for a 2022 Grammy Award for Best Instrumental Composition for her original composition "Beautiful is Black". 
In 2020, Younger was awarded "Player of the Year in Instruments Rare in Jazz" by the Jazz Journalists Association.  The same year she was named winner of the DownBeat Critics Poll in the category of "Rising Star" harpist. She also was featured on DownBeat magazine's July 2020 cover along with Dezron Douglas and six other artists.

Younger has received a handful of bylines for Revive Music and Harp Column Magazine and holds several leadership positions as a member of the Apollo Young Patrons Steering Committee, and Vice President of the Metro NYC and Long Island Chapters of the American Harp Society. She also serves as Director At Large of the American Harp Society, Inc. Stepping away from traditional venues to bring live performance to alternative spaces, in 2016 Younger served as curator of the weekly Harp On Park lunchtime concert series "highlighting the diversity of the harp and the contemporary importance of an ancient instrument" and in 2019, curated Her Song, highlighting the works of women composers for Arts Brookfield.  In 2017, she curated Divine Ella, a concert dedicated to the legacy of Ella Fitzgerald as part of the historic Schomburg Center for Research in Black Culture's annual Women's Jazz Festival. Brandee is among the musicians included in the book The New Face of Jazz by author, Cicily Janus, "Freedom of Expression: Interviews With Women in Jazz", by Chris Becker and was also featured in the Impulse Artist Series' "Alter Ego Series"[5] in November 2010, a young artist series created by classical pianist Jade Simmons.

Soul Awakening 

Surfacing six years after its completion in 2013, this eight-track collection was recorded in 2012 under the direction of producer and bassist Dezron Douglas and embodies the ambition, vigor, and aesthetic ideals of The Brandee Younger Quartet, at and since its inception. A benchmark recording that captures the group's collective brilliance in its infancy, Soul Awakening is a synthesis of the people, places, and moments that impacted Younger most. The first album recorded by the ensemble, Soul Awakening, marks the birth of Younger's artistic signature and the reemergence of the harp as a pillar of modern popular music.

Younger and Douglas, alongside drummer E. J. Strickland and saxophonists Stacy Dillard and Chelsea Baratz, enlist a who's who of featured collaborators to best translate their ethos. In doing so, Soul Awakening becomes a full circle release for Younger that combines her band with two of her greatest mentors: saxophonists Antoine Roney and Ravi Coltrane. Other notable contributors include drummer Chris Beck, trumpeter Freddie Hendrix, trumpeter Sean Jones, and vocalist Niia.

Soul Awakening received a positive critical response. Nate Chinen of NPR stated: "In terms of both production value and musical substance, it feels like an artifact of our moment: celestial, groove-forward, unabashed about its alchemies of style."  Briana Younger of the New Yorker wrote: "Her radiant playing is as cogent on hip-hop and R&B albums as it is set against classical and jazz backdrops."

"The new album came about after Ms. Younger performed a tribute to Ms. Ashby commissioned by the Revive Music Group. She connected with Casey Benjamin of the Robert Glasper Experiment, who produced 'Wax & Wane' with a contemporary flair. 'Afro-Harping,' which in Ms. Ashby's original 1968 version feels dialed into hippie frequencies, sounds on the new album like a post-Dilla instrumental, a remix in real-time." – Nate Chinen/The New York Times

Discography

As leader
2011: Prelude, Independent
2014: The Brandee Younger 4tet, Live at the Breeding Ground, Independent
2016: Wax & Wane, Independent/ Revive Music
2019: Soul Awakening, Independent
2020: Force Majeure, International Anthem
2021: Somewhere Different, Impulse!

Compilation appearances
2015: Supreme Sonacy, Blue Note Records / Revive Music
2018: A Day In The Life: Impressions of Pepper, Impulse!

As sideman/contributor
2006: Cassie, Cassie
2007: Finding Forever, Common 
2008: In This Day, E.J. Strickland
2008: Overdose On Life, featuring Drake, Mickey Factz, and Travis McCoy from Gym Class Heroes, Omen (record producer)
2009: Of Song, Marcus Strickland
2009: Blending Times, Ravi Coltrane 
2012: Retox, Lakecia Benjamin
2012: Moments, Michael Campagna
2013: New York: A Love Story, Mack Wilds 
2013: Love in the Future, John Legend 
2014: Face Forward, Jeremy Pelt
2016: Everything's Beautiful, Robert Glasper, Miles Davis
2016: The Dreaming Room, Laura Mvula
2016: Rebel/Find it Hard to Say, Ms Lauryn Hill
2016: The Songbook Sessions: Ella Fitzgerald, Jane Monheit
2017: Bringin' It, Christian McBride Big Band
2017: Residente, Residente
2017: Aromanticism, Moses Sumney 
2018: Universal Beings, Makaya McCraven
2018: Old Fashioned Gal, Kat Edmonson
2019: Sex High, Salaam Remi & James Fauntleroy
2019: Resavoir, Resavoir
2019: Dreams, Fairytales, Fantasies, A$AP Ferg ft Brent Faiyaz & Salaam Remi
2019: Poetry in Motion, The Soul Rebels
2020: Dreamers Do, Kat Edmonson
2020: I Think I'm Good, Kassa Overall
2020: We're New Again, Gil Scott-Heron, Makaya McCraven
2020: Pursuance: The Coltranes, Lakecia Benjamin
2020: Græ, Moses Sumney
2020: Lagos and Pepper Soup, Michael Olatuja
2020: Universal Beings E&F sides, Makaya McCraven
2020: Black Love, Salaam Remi ft. Teedra Moses & D-Nice
2020: Until this Day, Salaam Remi ft. Case
2020: VOYAGE-19, Bilal
2020: Petestrumentals 3, Pete Rock
2021: Private Space, Durand Jones & The Indications
2021: Talk Memory, BadBadNotGood
2021: Donda, Kanye West

References

External links 

Brandee Younger NPR First Listen
Bandcamp Daily Feature
The New Yorker Magazine
Greenwich House Music School Profile
Brandee Younger biography, AllMusic

1983 births
American harpists
American session musicians
Living people
University of Hartford Hartt School alumni
Steinhardt School of Culture, Education, and Human Development alumni
University of Hartford Hartt School faculty
Adelphi University faculty
American jazz harpists
Musicians from New York (state)
People from Hempstead (village), New York
Jazz musicians from New York (state)
Impulse! Records artists
Smooth jazz musicians
Jazz harpists